The Alfa Romeo Giulietta (Type 940) is a small family car (C-segment) manufactured and marketed by Alfa Romeo as a 5-door hatchback.  Production started near the end of 2009 and the model was introduced at the March 2010 Geneva Motor Show. The Giulietta placed second in the 2011 European Car of the Year awards. Between 2010 and 2019, production reached over 400,000. In 2020, Alfa Romeo announced that they were going to axe the Giulietta and production ended on 22 December 2020 spanning  10 years of sales from a period of 2010 to 2020. In total 469,067 examples were produced until 2020.

Overview

The platform used is Fiat Group's Compact also called as "C-Evo" during the planning stage. Practically this is an all new platform. Fiat Group used around 100 million euros to re-engineer the C-platform, previously used for the Fiat Stilo, Fiat Bravo and Lancia Delta, into C-Evo, it has a longer wheelbase, shorter overhangs and an advanced new type of MacPherson strut front suspension and multi-link rear suspension. Depending on the market and trim level, 16, 17, or 18-inch wheels are available. Available tire sizes are 205/55 R16, 225/45 R17, and 225/40 R18. The wheels use a 5-hole pattern with a 110 mm bolt circle. Only a five-door body is available for sale.

In a viability plan forwarded to the US Government in February 2009, Chrysler (a partner of Alfa Romeo parent company Fiat) reported that the 147 replacement would come to market as the Milano and that it could be built in the USA. However, as of early 2010 Fiat was instead planning to concentrate on bringing larger models to the US, such as the Giulia.

2014 changes

At the 2013 Frankfurt International Motor Show Alfa Romeo presented an updated Giulietta. Trim changes include a new Uconnect infotainment system with 5" or 6.5" Radionav touchscreen, a new front grille, a chrome-plated frame for the fog lights, a new and more supportive seat design, new wheels (16, 17 and 18-inch), as well as new exterior colours: Moonlight Pearl, Anodizzato Blue and Bronze. In the 2014 range, all engines comply with Euro 5+ (Euro 6-ready) emission standards.

2016 facelift 

Debuting at 2016 Geneva Motor Show, New Giulietta with facelifted front resembling Giulia and with new updated brand logo and new lettering. Trim line up will be changed to Giulietta, Giulietta Super and Giulietta Veloce. New body colour, new rims designs. Previous Giulietta QV will now be changed into sporty Veloce trim available with  engine and TCT transmission. Also debuting will be a new 1.6 JTDm  TCT diesel engine.

2019 model year 

For 2019 Giulietta has updated engines, all Euro 6 D: a 1.4-litre 120 PS turbo petrol, a 1.6-litre 120 PS Multijet with manual or Alfa TCT automatic transmission, and a 2.0-litre 170 PS Multijet with Alfa TCT.

Variants

Quadrifoglio Verde (2010–2016) 

The UK version was originally marketed as the Giulietta Cloverleaf, then Quadrifoglio Verde through '14-'15 before finally being renamed to the Veloce in 2016 until the end of production.

2014 Update 

This new facelifted version was premiered with a limited 'Launch Edition', recognizable by the black-finish on the sills all round. Available in new matt Grigio Magnesio Opaco along with Rosso Alfa and Rosso Competizione. Each car has its own numbered plaque. Around 700 units were made.

GTS Q2
The GTS Q2 is a version of Hong Kong market version GT Q2 with Sport Package. It includes the engine from 1.4 L TB MultiAir TCT, with a 6-speed TCT transmission. The Q2 also have front axle limited slip differential system installed.

120 HP 1.4 LPG Turbo (2011–2020) 
It is a version using LPG and petrol fuel types.

The LPG version was unveiled in 2011 Bologna Motor Show.

Sprint 60th Anniversary (2014–2020) 
At Centro Sperimentale di Balocco in October 2014, Alfa Romeo launched a 60th anniversary edition of the Giulietta. The Giulietta Sprint pays homage to the 1954 Giulietta (Tipo 750/101) which promised good performance at an affordable price. Other changes also include a carbon fibre effect interior trim, sporty exterior styling including side skirts, rear diffuser and oversized exhaust.

Squadra Corse TCT (2015) 
The Squadra Corse TCT is a limited edition version of the Giulietta Quadrifoglio Verde made for the South African market. It comes with the 1750 Turbo Petrol engine modified to produce , a custom sports exhaust and the Alfa Romeo TCT transmission. Only 100 of the Squadra Corse cars were produced.

Engines

The range of engines includes the new 1.4 L T-Jet petrol and M-jet diesel family, all turbocharged. A six-speed manual and Dual Dry Clutch Transmission TCT (Twin Clutch Transmission) introduced at the 2010 Paris International Motor Show, will be choice gearboxes for customers. Fitted to the 1.4 MultiAir petrol and 2.0 MultiJet diesel, this compact six-speed gearbox reduces the fuel consumption and CO2 emissions of both engines compared to the manual versions. The diesel drops to 119 g/km, while the petrol is reduced to 121 g/km, giving the latter best-in-class emissions and power output in its class for a petrol engine.

The Alfa Romeo Giulietta uses a new engine which utilizes a system known as Multiair. The system controls the amount of air going into the engine by controlling when air is allowed into the engine and how much the inlet valve opens. The system works by inserting a "tappet" between the cam shaft and the valve and the engine management system can control the amount of oil that is allowed into the "tappet" thus changing the effective opening profile of the inlet valve. The system can also change the overlap of the inlet and exhaust valves as well as changing the amount of lift and this allows the engine to maintain a steady pressure in the inlet manifold which is used to increase the amount of torque the engine produces while maintaining the efficiency of the engine. The system is said to increase torque by 20% while reducing emissions by a similar amount. All engines except the 1750 TBi have a Start&Stop system and all until 2016 are Euro5 rated. From late 2015, all engines in the Giulietta range are Euro 6 compliant and all apart from the 2.0L MultiJet2 Diesel (2014) come with improvements to their  emission and fuel economy figures.

The top of the range model has 1.7 L turbocharged engine the 1750 TBi –  with an exclusive Quadrifoglio Verde configuration (called Cloverleaf in the UK).  At the 2011 Bologna Motor Show an LPG version of the Giulietta was unveiled.

Specifications

Fuel consumption & CO2 emissions

Safety and driving aids

The Giulietta was designed with a target of a 5-star Euro NCAP safety rating. The car also has many electronic devices as standard: VDC (Vehicle Dynamic Control) electronic stability control, DST (Dynamic Steering Torque), Q2 electronic differential and Alfa Romeo DNA selector which allows driver to choose between three different driving settings; Dynamic, Normal and All-Weather, this setting controls the behaviour of engine, brakes, steering, suspension and gearbox.

The Alfa Romeo Giulietta is equipped with a reactive head restraint and gained five star rating and overall score of 87/100 in the Euro NCAP car safety tests. That result makes it the safest compact car ever. Giulietta's result (97% Adult Occupant, 85% Child Occupant, 63% Pedestrian Protection and 86% Safety Assist) means that the car will also have five-star rating in 2012 when the Euro NCAP system will have reached maximum severity. The Giulietta was named as best performing Small Family category car in 2010 by Euro NCAP.

In 2017, the Giulietta was re-tested using the 2017 Euro NCAP test procedures.

Sales

Marketing, sponsorship and motorsport

Alfa Romeo Giulietta Quadrifoglio Verde is used as Superbike World Championship safety car (except in the United States rounds, where because of Fiat marketing, the Dodge Challenger SRT and some Ram Trucks are used since the Giulietta brand is not sold in the United States, but the Ram and SRT brands are.). A fleet of Giuliettas was used also in Eco Targa Florio organisation.

The Giulietta was used as a hero car in the 2013 film Fast & Furious 6. To promote the film, Alfa Romeo published a series of photos featuring Giuliettas that were destroyed during the film's production. In addition, six Giuliettas were offered with a dashboard plaque signed by cast members of the film, as well as the option to attend a stunt day with a stunt coordinator.

The Handy Motorsports BTCC Giulietta

A NGTC-spec Giulietta entered the 2018 British Touring Car Championship by Handy Motorsport, achieving a race win.

The Romeo Ferraris TCR Giulietta QV

In 2015, the Italian tuning garage Romeo Ferraris started to work, without the marques help, in the Alfa Romeo Giulietta to race in TCR International Series, appearing under the banner of Mulsanne Racing, with Michela Cerruti for the first two races of the 2016 season. They returned in the 5th round in Salzburgring with second car for Petř Fulín and a new color scheme, staying in the championship until the end of the year with two cars.

In 2017, Davit Kajaia and Dusan Borković joined forces with Romeo Ferraris and raced the full TCR-season as GE-Force, taking three victories in Georgia, Bahrain and Salzburgring.

In 2018, mostly because WTCC and TCR Internacional became one, the team Mulsanne Racing entered the World Touring Car Cup (WTCR) with two Alfa Romeo Giulietta QV for the two Alfa Romeo legends Gianni Morbidelli, which raced until Vila Real being replaced by Kevin Ceccon (who scored a race win in Suzuka), and Fabrizio Giovanardi, who was replaced in the Suzuka round by Luigi "Gigi" Ferrara (2nd overall in TCR Italy 2018).

For the 2019 season, the car received a major aerodynamic upgrade being renamed as "Alfa Romeo Giulietta Veloce". Team Mulsanne maintained Ceccon and hired Ma Qing Hua (ex-Formula E and WTCC driver). Alongside the World Cup cars, Romeo Ferraris will have about 8–10 Giuliettas racing in TCR Italy, UK, USA, Australia and China.

In 2020 the Team Mulsanne car driven by Jean-Karl Vernay entered into the World Touring Car Cup finished 3rd in the Championship overall and won the WTCR Trophy as the highest car without factory support.

In Jan 2022 it won the TCR section of the Michelin Pilot Challenge race in Daytona USA.

Awards
The Giulietta came as second in European Car of the Year 2011. The Multiair engines used in Giulietta was voted for the best new engine in 2010. The car has also collected the following awards:
Auto Europa 2011
Auto Trophy 2010 (Design Trophy – Compact Category) – Auto Zeitung
Compact Car of the Year Trophée L'Argus
Greek Car of the Year 2011
Czech Republic Car of the Year 2011
 Die besten Autos 2010 – Import compact cars category – Auto, Motor und Sport
 Die besten Autos 2011 – Import compact cars category – Auto, Motor und Sport
2019 Auto Bild magazine win of "Design" category "Best Brands" competition.

Notes

References

External links

Official site

Giulietta (940)
Compact cars
Euro NCAP small family cars
Hot hatches
Front-wheel-drive vehicles
Cars introduced in 2010